Jefferson's Bourbon is a Louisville, Kentucky-based brand of bourbon whiskey which is distilled, blended, and bottled in the US by Pernod-Ricard. The brand was first released in 1997.

Jefferson's has used experimental blending and aging techniques, such as aging bourbon at sea, where wave action can affect the product's development.  It also produces a rye whiskey. Jefferson's works in four step process for making bourbon which is: Distill, age, cut to proof and bottle putting more time and focus into the maturation process.

The Jefferson's brand was initially applied exclusively to bourbon distilled by other companies. Jefferson's acquired Kentucky Artisan Distillery in Crestwood, Kentucky. 25% percent of barrels warehoused for aging in 2017 were produced at Kentucky Artisan Distillery.  The other 75% are produced by independent distilleries.

History
Jefferson's Bourbon was launched in 1997 by Trey Zoeller, a native Kentuckian, and his father Chet Zoeller, a bourbon historian. He founded a company called McClain & Kyne after Zoeller's past relatives, including an 8th generation grandmother arrested in 1799 for moonshining. McClain & Kyne was purchased by Castle Brands around 2005. Asked about the name, Zoeller reportedly said, "I had no marketing budget. I simply wanted a recognizable face associated with history and tradition."

In June 2015, Castle Brands announced a 20% purchase of Copperhead Distillery Company, which owns and operates Kentucky Artisan Distillery. 

The brand began with Jefferson's Reserve, then expanded with the addition of Jefferson's Presidential Select, and Jefferson's Small Batch. Jefferson's now produces several varieties of bourbon and rye, including some limited edition offerings.

In 2022, Pernod Ricard announced an investment of $250 million for Jefferson's Bourbon to build a five years to build a new, carbon-neutral distillery and aging warehouses in Marion County, Kentucky.

Production
In addition to conventional bourbons, ryes, and whiskeys, the label also produces some other noteworthy products.

Jefferson's Ocean (45% ABV) was initially an experimental bottling before being made a standard offering. Barrels of bourbon aged 6–7 years are loaded onto ships, which then sail around the world for six months, a process that Jefferson's claims develops the bourbon more quickly through the motion of the waves

Jefferson's Collaboration (41% ABV) was blended in collaboration with Edward Lee, the chef of restaurant in Louisville, to pair well with food.

In 2021, Jefferson's released Jefferson’s Rye Cognac Finish Whiskey (47% ABC) consisting of an aged rye whiskey finished for 9 to 19 months in used French Cognac casks.

Jefferson's later released an Ocean aged at sea Rye Whiskey as their first-ever Ocean rye whiskey expression as Voyage #26.

Reviews
Jefferson's Small Batch Bourbon and Jefferson's Reserve received a 92 and 94 respectively from the Beverage Tasting Institute in 2012. Jefferson's Rye received a 92 from Wine Enthusiast in 2012.

Food critic Morgan Murphy said "The dark amber of this bourbon makes it look like woodpile water, but the sweet caramel taste has a very restrained oak flavor."

See also
 Bourbon whiskey brands

References

External links
 
 Castle Brands website

Kentucky cuisine
Bourbon whiskey
Products introduced in 1997
Pernod Ricard brands
Crestwood, Kentucky
1997 establishments in Kentucky